Faith in the Future is the second studio album by English singer and songwriter Louis Tomlinson. It was released on 11 November 2022 independently through BMG. Tomlinson announced the album's release date, track listing and album artwork on 31 August 2022. The album was supported by three singles: "Bigger Than Me", "Out of My System" and "Silver Tongues". The album debuted at No. 1 in the UK making it his first in the country.

Background
Following the release of his debut album Walls, Tomlinson confirmed in July 2020 that he would be working on his second album. Tomlinson confirmed that he had finished the album in August 2022. Upon the album announcement, he wrote;

Tomlinson also stated that he had enjoyed the recording process a lot more than working on Walls.

A deluxe CD zine edition of Faith in the Future includes two more songs, "Headline" and "Holding On to Heartache".

Conception
On 29 September 2022, Tomlinson appeared on American DJ Zach Sang's YouTube podcast Zach Sang Show, where he talked about how Faith in the Future became the title of the album;

Singles
Tomlinson announced "Bigger Than Me" as the first single, which was released on 1 September 2022. The second single, "Out of My System", was released 14 October 2022. On 8 November 2022, Tomlinson announced via his social media that "Silver Tongues" will be released as the third single on the following day.

Critical reception

At Metacritic, which assigns a normalised rating out of 100 to reviews from professional critics, the album has an average score of 68 out of 100, based on four reviews, indicating "generally favorable reviews". 

In a mixed review, Clash writer Robin Murray stated that "Faith in the Future" can at times become stuck in formula, failing to rock the boat in the process," and added that "It's all perfectly pleasant, but you end up yearning to an injection of… well, anything, really."
Writing for Dork Jessica Goodman described the album as "eclectic, electric, and always energetic" while also stating that it's "a collection of songs purpose-made for pints-in-the-air, arms-around-shoulders, voices-to-the-rafters sing-alongs."
Rhian Daly of NME notes that the record "feels much more assured" and "is a solid step forward as the musician continues what he's acknowledged will be 'an ever-evolving process'." The Guardian's Alim Kheraj lamented that "Tomlinson himself, is lost in a sea of influences", but pointed out that "apocalyptic rave synths and woozy reverb-heavy guitars at least gesture towards experimentation."

Accolades 
At the end of 2022, Faith in the Future appeared on critics' lists ranking the year's top albums.

Commercial performance 
Faith in the Future debuted at number five on the Billboard 200 selling 43,000 album-equivalent units, including 37,500 in pure album sales. This marks Tomlinson's highest-charting effort and his best selling week to date. The album debuted at No. 1 in the UK making it his first in the country. Tomlinson spoke about earning his first number one in the UK calling it "an absolute honour." In addition, Faith in the Future also peaked at number one in Spain and Belgium.

Track listing

Notes 
  signifies an additional producer

Charts

Weekly charts

Year-end charts

Release history

References

2022 albums
Louis Tomlinson albums